The 18-hole private golf course at Haworth Country Club officially opened in 1965 is located in Haworth, New Jersey. 
 
Re-designed by the golf course architect, Robert Trent Jones Jr. in 2000, the course length is  7000 yards. The course has five sets of tees and over four acres of teeing ground.
 
Other amenities include grass driving range, seven indoor tennis courts, gourmet restaurant, bar, and meeting rooms. Haworth Country Club is located 10.5 miles from the George Washington Bridge, and is in a deciduous forest behind the reservoir.

References

External links
Map: 

1965 establishments in New Jersey
Sports venues in Bergen County, New Jersey
Golf clubs and courses in New Jersey
Haworth, New Jersey